The Potosi Brewery is located in Potosi, Wisconsin, United States. It was added to the National Register of Historic Places in 1980.

History
Beer began being brewed in the building in 1852 by Gabriel Hail and John Albrecht. In 1886, the building was bought by Adam Schumacher. The Potosi Brewing Company was officially founded by Schumacher and his brothers, Nicholas and Henry, in 1906. In 1972, the brewery ceased operations. Gary David purchased the building in 1995 and donated it to the Potosi Foundation in 2001 and the brewery property was officially transferred. The Potosi Brewing Company building re-opened in 2008 following a $7.5 million restoration. The Potosi Foundation, a 501(c)(3) non-profit organization and sole owner of the Potosi Brewing Company, reopened the brewery in 2008.

The Potosi Brewery, aka Potosi Brewing Company, is solely owned by the Potosi Foundation, a 501(c)3 which is run by a board of elected volunteers.

Museums
In 2004, it was chosen as the site of the National Brewery Museum by the American Breweriana Association.

The site also features the Potosi Brewing Company Transportation Museum, with historic vehicles and displays about the area transportation of beer to customers.

References

External links
 Potosi Brewery website

Buildings and structures completed in 1890
Museums established in 2004
Industrial buildings and structures on the National Register of Historic Places in Wisconsin
Museums in Grant County, Wisconsin
Brewery buildings in the United States
Drinks museums in the United States
Transportation museums in Wisconsin
National Register of Historic Places in Grant County, Wisconsin
Beer museums